NATO reporting name for AA series air-to-air missiles, with Soviet designations:

 AA-1 "Alkali" (Kaliningrad K-5)
 AA-2 "Atoll" (Vympel K-13)
 AA-3 "Anab" (Kaliningrad K-8)
 AA-4 "Awl" (Raduga K-9)
 AA-5 "Ash" (Bisnovat R-4)
 AA-6 "Acrid" (Bisnovat R-40) 
 AA-7 "Apex" (Vympel R-23)
 AA-8 "Aphid" (Molniya R-60)
 AA-9 "Amos" (Vympel R-33)
 AA-10 "Alamo" (Vympel R-27)
 AA-11 "Archer" (Vympel R-73)
 AA-12 "Adder" (Vympel R-77)
 AA-X-13 "Axehead" (Vympel R-37)
 - none - Novator K-100 (was KS-172, R-172 etc.)
 CH-AA-7 (PL-12)
 CH-AA-9 (PL-10)
 CH-AA-10 "Abaddon" (PL-15)

See also: NATO reporting name

References

air-to-air missiles
Cold War air-to-air missiles of the Soviet Union